Jani Petteri Hurme (born January 7, 1975) is a Finnish former professional ice hockey goaltender. He played 76 games in the National Hockey League with the Ottawa Senators and Florida Panthers between 2000 and 2003. He also played several seasons in the Finnish SM-liiga during his career, which lasted from 1993 to 2011. He was drafted by the Ottawa Senators in the third round of the 1997 NHL Entry Draft with the 58th overall pick. Internationally Hurme played for the Finnish national team at the 2002 Winter Olympics and the 2003 World Championship.

Playing career
After playing three seasons for TPS in Finland's SM-liiga, Hurme made his North American debut in the International Hockey League with the Indianapolis Ice during the 1997–98 season. He played 48 games with the Senators over three seasons before being traded to the Florida Panthers. He appeared in another 28 games with the Panthers during the 2002–03 season.

Hurme was traded to the Atlanta Thrashers, but due to very serious illness he did not play a single game in Atlanta. Suffering from the crippling effects of hospital infections, Hurme needed over two years to recuperate.

Eventually Hurme returned to the ice, and in the 2005–06 season he played with the Columbia Inferno of the ECHL and Chicago Wolves of the AHL before joining the Portland Pirates, for whom he started sixteen playoff games. Hurme's NHL rights are currently owned by the Tampa Bay Lightning.

For the 2006–07 season, Hurme returned to Finland and played again for TPS. He played for Malmö Redhawks from 2007 to 2009. He returned to Finland to play for Ilves in December 2009.

He spent his off-seasons in Turku, Finland, where he owns a house in the neighbourhood of Hirvensalo.

Career statistics

Regular season and playoffs

International

Awards
 Lasse Oksanen trophy (top player in SM-liiga): 1996–97 season
 Urpo Ylönen trophy (top goaltender in SM-liiga): 1996–97 season
 Jarmo Wasama memorial trophy (top rookie in SM-liiga): 1995–96 season

External links
 

1975 births
Chicago Wolves players
Cincinnati Cyclones (IHL) players
Columbia Inferno players
Detroit Vipers players
Finnish ice hockey goaltenders
Florida Panthers players
Grand Rapids Griffins (IHL) players
Ice hockey players at the 2002 Winter Olympics
Indianapolis Ice players
Living people
Malmö Redhawks players
Olympic ice hockey players of Finland
Ottawa Senators draft picks
Ottawa Senators players
Portland Pirates players
Sportspeople from Turku
HC TPS players